Dilvo Lotti (27 June 1914 – 22 April 2009) was an Italian painter. His work was part of the painting event in the art competition at the 1936 Summer Olympics.

References

1914 births
2009 deaths
20th-century Italian painters
Italian male painters
Olympic competitors in art competitions
People from San Miniato
20th-century Italian male artists